California Institute of Integral Studies (CIIS) is a private university in San Francisco, California. It was founded in 1968. As of 2020, the institute operates in two locations: the main campus near the confluence of the Civic Center, SoMa, and Mission districts, and another campus for the American College of Traditional Chinese Medicine in the Potrero Hill neighborhood. As of 2020, CIIS has a total of 1,510 students and 80 core faculty members.

Although the institute has no official spiritual path, some of its historical roots lie among followers of the Bengali sage Sri Aurobindo. The term "Integral", in the school's name, refers to Aurobindo's Integral Yoga (purnayoga), here interpreted as the integration of mind, body, and spirit.

History

American Academy of Asian Studies (1951–1968)

California Institute of Integral Studies (CIIS) grew out of the earlier American Academy of Asian Studies, founded by Louis Gainsborough in 1951. Other early contributors to the founding of the academy include Frederic Spiegelberg. The academy was an independent educational institution set up to study Eastern culture and philosophy  and improve the dialogue between east and west. Soon after the founding of the institution, Gainsborough was joined by Alan Watts and Haridas Chaudhuri, two persons that played a crucial role in the development of the academy's academic profile.

Both Watts and Chaudhuri were oriented towards Eastern religions and philosophy and integrated this into their teaching and colloquia. Watts, a teacher of Eastern mysticism, established the academy as a meeting place for counter-cultural movements, also known as the San Francisco Renaissance. Chaudhuri, a scholar of Aurobindo, developed the field of Integral counseling psychology, an integration of eastern philosophy with the growing field of counseling psychology. According to sources “Chaudhuri’s vision of integral education, like that of Alan Watts, was based on connecting the cultural traditions of the East and the West”.

California Institute of Asian Studies (1968–1980)

In 1968, Chaudhuri was instrumental in the founding and development of a new institution called the California Institute of Asian Studies. The new institution grew out of the former American Academy of Asian Studies, which was winding down. In this period several developments took place. Paul Herman continued the work of Chaudhuri and also designed the institute's first graduate degree in Integral Psychology, the Integral Counseling Psychology (ICP) degree, which was established in 1973.

Frederic Spiegelberg, who helped found the predecessor American Academy of Asian Studies, served as the institute's second president, from 1976 to 1978.

California Institute of Integral Studies (1980–present)

In 1980 the Institute underwent a change of name, now emerging as California Institute of Integral Studies.

In 1981, the institute was granted regional accreditation and became a member of the national community of colleges and universities. By the mid-eighties several academic programs were available, including the Clinical Psychology program, the Counseling Psychology program, and the East/West Psychology program. Several new programs were also launched in the 1985–1986 academic year, including the Organizational Development program and Transformation certificate program, and the External Studies program. Other services, available to students at this time, included an extensive library, as well as the Integral Counseling Center, a community-based service facility that supported the training needs of clinical and counseling students.

In 2008, the San Francisco Chronicle reported that psychology students at the New College of California were transferring to the California Institute of Integral Studies, due to the closing of the former institution.

In 2012, CIIS, with support from the Aetna Foundation, announced that it was introducing its new onsite Health and Wellness Coaching program to San Francisco's Mid-Market District. The program was to be of benefit to children and families living at 10th & Mission Family Housing, a supportive housing project run by Mercy Housing California. In 2013 Jordan published a case report that summarized the experiences from the Integrative Wellness Coaching (IWC) project among homeless and low-income individuals in San Francisco. The IWC model was, at this time, included in the Master of Arts program in Integrative Health Studies at the California Institute of Integral Studies.

Philosophical background

Central to the early history of the institute is a model of so-called integral education. Originally set up to study Eastern culture and philosophy in the beginning of the 1950s, the Institute developed further in this direction with the arrival of Haridas Chaudhuri. Chaudhuri introduced the integral philosophy of Sri Aurobindo as a navigating principle for education and established a perspective that sought a holistic view of the human being; an integration of material and spiritual values; as well as an integration of Eastern and Western philosophies and worldviews. By the mid-eighties this model of education was firmly established. In 1985 Voigt reported on the graduate programs at CIIS and elaborated on the experience of integral education at the institute. In the late 1990s, CIIS was one of several institutions in the United States associated with the study of Holism and Consciousness.

There is also a connection between the roots of CIIS and the Human Potential Movement of the 1950s and 1960s. Among the students who attended the colloquia at the American Academy of Asian Studies in the 1950s was Michael Murphy and Dick Price, founders of the Esalen Institute at Big Sur. According to Gleig and Floress, "one can trace a direct line from Integral Yoga through [the Cultural Integration Fellowship] to two of the major centers of the Human Potential movement and the transpersonal psychology field it birthed: Esalen and California Institute of Integral Studies (CIIS)."

Gleig and Flores further explain that:

According to Jim Ryan, CIIS, as developed by the founder (Chaudhuri), "had a very wide academic reach, far beyond its basic East-West philosophy concentration. Theses and dissertations were done over many years on the politics, economics, anthropology, sociology, and area studies of many nations of the world."

Academic program

CIIS consists of four schools: the School of Professional Psychology & Health, the School of Consciousness and Transformation (mainly humanities subjects), the School of Undergraduate Studies, and the American College of Traditional Chinese Medicine (ACTCM). ACTCM became the fourth school after merging with CIIS on July 1, 2015.

The institute offers interdisciplinary and cross-cultural graduate studies in psychology, counseling, philosophy, religion, cultural anthropology, transformative studies and leadership, integrative health, women's spirituality, and community mental health. Many courses combine mainstream academic curricula with a spiritual orientation, including influences from a broad spectrum of mystical or esoteric traditions.

Accreditation and exam pass rates

CIIS is accredited by the WASC Senior College and University Commission. In addition, degrees offered through ACTCM are accredited by the Accreditation Commission for Acupuncture and Oriental Medicine (ACAOM).

In 2018, The Board of Behavioral Sciences (BBS), California's state regulatory agency responsible for licensing, examination, and enforcement of Licensed Marriage and Family Therapists (LMFTs), released statistics for its January 1, 2018 through June 30, 2018 exam cycle.

 CIIS examinees' pass rate was 82% (Standard exam), compared with a 77% pass rate for all schools in California.
 83% of CIIS first-time Standard exam-takers passed, compared with an 80% pass rate for California schools overall.

The Doctor of Psychology (PsyD) program in Clinical Psychology is not accredited by the American Psychological Association (APA). The program received APA accreditation in 2003, but accreditation was revoked in 2011, and CIIS's appeal of the revocation was denied in 2012 on the basis that it was "not fully consistent with the Guidelines and Principles for Accreditation of Programs in Professional Psychology", notably "several requirements in the following areas: Domain B: Program Philosophy, Objectives, and Curriculum Plan; Domain C: Program Resources; Domain E: Student-Faculty Relations; Domain F: Program Self-Assessment and Quality Enhancement." CIIS applied for APA accreditation in June 2016, but voluntarily withdrew its application in June 2017.

Notable people
 Angeles Arrien
 Dave Carter
 Haridas Chaudhuri
 Allan Combs
 Nadinne I. Cruz
 Angela Davis
 Stanislav Grof
 Andrej Grubacic
 Will Hall
 Judith Hanson Lasater
 Noah Levine
 Joanna Macy
 Robert A. McDermott
 Chani Nicholas
 Starhawk
 Brian Swimme
 Richard Tarnas
 Judith Tyberg
 Douglas Vakoch
 Alan Watts

References

External links
Official website

California Institute of Integral Studies
Integral thought
Schools accredited by the Western Association of Schools and Colleges
New Age organizations
Educational institutions established in 1968
South of Market, San Francisco
Private universities and colleges in California